Mahunkaglyphus is a genus of mites in the family Acaridae.

Species
 Mahunkaglyphus solimani Eraky, 1998

References

Acaridae